Btaaboura is a village in Koura District of Lebanon. The population is Greek Orthodox.  A church is being constructed as of June 2011, it is dedicated to St. Elias.

In 1997 and on 21 November 2011, Michel Temer, then Vice President of Brazil, visited Btaaboura, which is the birthplace of his father, Nakhoul (Miguel) Temer, and mother, Marcha Barbar.

References

External links
 Btaaboura, Localiban

Eastern Orthodox Christian communities in Lebanon
Populated places in the North Governorate
Koura District